Toon de Ruiter (12 June 1935 – 23 November 2001) was a Dutch rower. He competed in the men's coxed four event at the 1960 Summer Olympics.

References

1935 births
2001 deaths
Dutch male rowers
Olympic rowers of the Netherlands
Rowers at the 1960 Summer Olympics
People from East Nusa Tenggara